Christ the King Regional High School is a co-educational, college preparatory, Catholic high school for grades 9-12 located in Middle Village, Queens, New York, United States and established in 1962. It is located within the Roman Catholic Diocese of Brooklyn. The school is next to the Middle Village–Metropolitan Avenue station of the New York City Subway's .

History
Originally built and operated by the Roman Catholic Diocese of Brooklyn as a diocesan high school, Christ the King High School began with its first freshman class starting September 1962 with its teachers at Mater Christi High School in Astoria, Queens. The first classes at the unfinished Middle Village location were held on May 6, 1963 and the school building was dedicated in April 1964.

At its start, Christ the King was organized into separate boys and girls divisions staffed by two religious orders of Marist Brothers and Daughters of Wisdom. The two divisions occupied opposite wings of the building and shared its library, cafeteria and auditorium. The top floors of the separate wings were designed and built as residential facilities to accommodate the two religious orders living areas.

The first graduation took place on June 23, 1966 with 840 graduates, exactly split between 420 boys and girls. Attendance at all of the Brooklyn Diocese operated high schools was free until September 1968 when it initiated a $300 tuition charge for the first time.

By 1970, the enormous changes underway in Catholic religious orders compelled the Sisters of Wisdom to withdraw from staffing the Girls Division and coeducational classes were started to transition into merging the two divisions. In September 1971, Mr. Hugh Kirwan became the first lay Principal of the Girl's Division. In 1972 the Marist Brothers announced they would be ending its connection with the school.

In September 1973 Mr. Kirwin was appointed to run a unified school at a time of serious discord with the rapidly expanding lay faculty that delayed opening of classes for one week. After two years of futile negotiations, no contract was signed and in October 1975 the Bishop announced that Christ the King High School would be closed and seniors would be allowed to finish there, but all other students would be transferred to other diocesan schools.

The diocese plan outraged the students and supported by their families, they went on strike and refused to vacate the building. Discussions between the school supporters and the diocese finally resulted in September 1976 becoming Christ the King Regional High School.

Academics
The school offers various honors and Advanced Placement classes. Select students have received outstanding PSAT and SAT scores. Numerous students have been accepted into prestigious schools, such as Yale, UPenn, Fordham University, Johns Hopkins University, and Macaulay Honors College and receive substantial scholarships to lesser prestigious institutions. Admission is based upon 6th, 7th, and 8th grade records, as well as the TACHS exam.

Athletics
This school is well known for athletics, especially its basketball teams. They have at least one mythical national championship for girls basketball in 2005. The girls basketball team won eleven straight Class A A New York State Federation girls' title from 1990-2000. They also won Class AA titles in 2005, 2006, 2010 and 2019. The boys basketball team has won the 1989, 2010, 2013, and 2014 State Federation titles. Christ the King has produced well-known basketball stars such as Lamar Odom, Sue Bird, Chamique Holdsclaw, Tina Charles, Rawle Alkins, Jayson Williams, Omar Cook, Speedy Claxton, Jose Alvarado, and Khalid Reeves.

Christ the King offers a wide variety of sports including bowling, cross country fall, handball, indoor track winter and soccer. The boys-only programs are baseball, ice hockey, football and outdoor track winter. The girls-only programs are softball, cheerleading, dance, swimming, tennis and volleyball. The CK Royal Step team is co-ed. Christ the King also has a fitness center.

Clubs
Clubs include art, broadcasting (formerly Royal Vision), ceramics, computer, key club, literary & art magazine, national honor society, performing arts, portfolio Royal Times (newspaper), PDHP (Program for the Development of Human Potential) Prevention Leadership,  speech & debate team, theater arts and video yearbook & yearbook, rosary club, international, and freshman, sophomore, junior and senior student councils.

Notable alumni

 
Ray Abruzzo, actor The Sopranos
Wendell Alexis, retired basketball player and three-time MVP of the German Bundesliga.
Jose Alvarado (basketball), ACC Defensive Player of the Year, NBA player for the New Orleans Pelicans
Erick Barkley, former NBA player
J. Darius Bikoff, founder and CEO of Energy Brands
Sue Bird (born 1980), Israeli-American Women's National Basketball Association point guard, five-time Olympic champion, twelve-time All-Star (Seattle Storm), 4× WNBA champion (2004, 2010, 2018, 2020 Seattle Storm).
Tina Charles, WNBA player for the New York Liberty, two-time NCAA Champion
Jason Cipolla, former Syracuse Orange basketball player
Speedy Claxton, former NBA player
Anthony Como, politician 
Omar Cook, professional American basketball player and two-time Montenegrin league champion (KK Budućnost)
Richard J. Daly, executive
Shay Doron (born 1985), Israeli WNBA basketball guard (New York Liberty)
Chamique Holdsclaw '95, University of Tennessee, WNBA player for the Atlanta Dream and the San Antonio Silver Stars.
Steve Karsay, Major League Baseball pitcher
Daniel G. McGowan, environmental activist jailed and fined in 2006 for his involvement with Earth Liberation Front actions
Lamar Odom, retired American basketball player NBA and two-time NBA champion (Los Angeles Lakers), NBA Sixth Man of the Year
Derrick Phelps, former professional basketball player and current Associate Head Coach at Washington State University
 Tarik Phillip (born 1993), British-American basketball player in the Israel Basketball Premier League
Khalid Reeves, University of Arizona Wildcats and NBA player 1994-2000, including Miami Heat and Chicago Bulls.
Tyson Walker (born 2000), college basketball player for the Michigan State Spartans
Allen Watson, former MLB pitcher and 2-time World Series champion with the New York Yankees.
Jayson Williams (born 1968), former NBA player for the Philadelphia 76ers and New Jersey Nets, pleaded guilty to assault in 2010 in the shooting death of his limousine driver

References
Notes

External links
Christ the King homepage

Educational institutions established in 1962
Middle Village, Queens
Roman Catholic high schools in Queens, New York
1962 establishments in New York City